Parratt is a surname. Notable people with the surname include:

Joe Parratt or Joe Beagle, award-winning songwriter
John Parratt (1859–1905), English first-class cricketer
Lyman G. Parratt (1908–1995), physicist
Peggy Parratt, professional football player who played in the "Ohio League"
Percy Parratt (born 1887), Australian rules footballer
Tom Parratt (born 1986), Scottish professional footballer
Walter Parratt KCVO (1841–1924), English organist and composer

See also
Parratt v. Taylor, 451 U.S. 527 (1981), a case decided by the United States Supreme Court
Barratt (disambiguation)
Parret
Parrot
Parrott (disambiguation)